Amur (Amır) is a rural locality (a selo) and the administrative centre of Amurskoye Rural Settlement, Ust-Koksinsky District, the Altai Republic, Russia. The population was 763 as of 2016. There are 11 streets.

Geography 
Amur is located 47 km northwest of Ust-Koksa (the district's administrative centre) by road. Abay is the nearest rural locality.

References 

Rural localities in Ust-Koksinsky District